The 26th Dallas–Fort Worth Film Critics Association Awards, honoring the best in film for 2020, were announced on February 10, 2021. These awards "recognizing extraordinary accomplishment in film" are presented annually by the Dallas–Fort Worth Film Critics Association (DFWFCA), based in the Dallas–Fort Worth metroplex region of Texas. The association, founded in and presenting awards since 1990, includes 30 film critics for print, radio, television, and internet publications based in North Texas. It is also committed to ensuring that their membership represents a broad range of voices, ideas and perspectives from across cultural, gender and ideological spectra.

Nomadland was the DFWFCA's most awarded film of 2020, taking three honors: Best Picture, Best Director (Chloé Zhao), and Best Cinematography.

Winners and nominees

Category awards
Winners are listed first and highlighted with boldface. Other films ranked by the annual poll are listed in order. While most categories saw 5 honorees named, categories ranged from as many as 10 (Best Picture) to as few as 2 (Best Animated Film, Best Screenplay, Best Cinematography, and Best Musical Score).

{| class=wikitable style="width="100%"
|-
! style="background:#EEDD82;" ! style="width="50%" | Best Picture
! style="background:#EEDD82;" ! style="width="50%" | Best Director
|-
| valign="top" |
 Nomadland
 Promising Young Woman
 The Trial of the Chicago 7
 Minari
 One Night in Miami...
 Mank
 Ma Rainey's Black Bottom
 Sound of Metal
 Da 5 Bloods
 First Cow
| valign="top" |
 Chloé Zhao – Nomadland
 Emerald Fennell – Promising Young Woman
 Regina King – One Night in Miami...
 David Fincher – Mank
 Aaron Sorkin – The Trial of the Chicago 7
|-
! style="background:#EEDD82;" ! style="width="50%" | Best Actor
! style="background:#EEDD82;" ! style="width="50%" | Best Actress
|-
| valign="top" |
 Chadwick Boseman – Ma Rainey's Black Bottom as Levee Green
 Riz Ahmed – Sound of Metal as Ruben Stone
 Gary Oldman – Mank as Herman J. Mankiewicz
 Delroy Lindo – Da 5 Bloods as Paul
 Anthony Hopkins – The Father as Anthony
| valign="top" |
 Carey Mulligan – Promising Young Woman as Cassandra "Cassie" Thomas
 Frances McDormand – Nomadland as Fern
 Viola Davis – Ma Rainey's Black Bottom as Ma Rainey
 Vanessa Kirby – Pieces of a Woman as Marta Weiss
 Andra Day – The United States vs. Billie Holiday as Billie Holiday
|-
! style="background:#EEDD82;" ! style="width="50%" | Best Supporting Actor
! style="background:#EEDD82;" ! style="width="50%" | Best Supporting Actress
|-
| valign="top" |
 Daniel Kaluuya – Judas and the Black Messiah as Fred Hampton
 Leslie Odom Jr. – One Night in Miami... as Sam Cooke
 Sacha Baron Cohen – The Trial of the Chicago 7 as Abbie Hoffman
 Bill Murray – On the Rocks as Felix Keane
 Paul Raci – Sound of Metal as Joe
| valign="top" |
 Amanda Seyfried – Mank as Marion Davies
 Youn Yuh-jung – Minari as Soon-ja
 Helena Zengel – News of the World as Johanna Leonberger / Cicada
 Maria Bakalova – Borat Subsequent Moviefilm as Tutar Sagdiyev
 Olivia Colman – The Father as Anne
|-
! style="background:#EEDD82;" ! style="width="50%" | Best Documentary Film
! style="background:#EEDD82;" ! style="width="50%" | Best Foreign Language Film
|-
| valign="top" |
 Time
 Dick Johnson Is Dead
 Boys State
 The Dissident
 Crip Camp
| valign="top" |
 Minari
 Another Round
 The Life Ahead
 La Llorona
 Martin Eden
|-
! style="background:#EEDD82;" ! style="width="50%" | Best Animated Film
! style="background:#EEDD82;" ! style="width="50%" | Best Screenplay
|-
| valign="top" |
 Soul
 Wolfwalkers
| valign="top" |
 Emerald Fennell – Promising Young Woman
 Aaron Sorkin – The Trial of the Chicago 7
|-
! style="background:#EEDD82;" ! style="width="50%" | Best Cinematography
! style="background:#EEDD82;" ! style="width="50%" | Best Musical Score
|-
| valign="top" |
 Joshua James Richards – Nomadland
 Erik Messerschmidt – Mank
| valign="top" |
 Trent Reznor and Atticus Ross – Mank
 James Newton Howard – News of the World
|}

Special award

Russell Smith Award
 Minari''', for "best low-budget or cutting-edge independent film"

References

External links
 Official website

2020
2020 film awards